Goldsithney (meaning fair of St Sithney) is a village in west Cornwall, England, United Kingdom. It is in the civil parish of Perranuthnoe.

The centre of Goldsithney is a conservation area and has two pubs (the Trevelyan Arms and the Crown Inn), a shop and a post office. The village holds a Charter fair in August each year.

Fair folklore
According to Popular Romances of the West of England by Robert Hunt:

References

External links

Villages in Cornwall
Penwith
Charter fairs